John Butler is the first full-length album by the John Butler Trio, released 27 December 1998.

It was recorded at Studio Couch, Fremantle and engineered by George Nikoloudis and Shaun O'Callaghan, mixed by Shaun O'Callaghan and George Nikoloudis and mastered by Shaun O'Callaghan and Richard Mahony at Studio Couch and Toad Hall.

All music and lyrics were written, arranged and produced by John Butler, except for the words of the chorus in "Colours" which were from Sly and the Family Stone.

With Jason McGann on drums and Gavin Shoesmith on bass, the first version of the group recorded the album in December 1998 which was launched at Mojos Bar in North Fremantle.

Track listing
All songs written and composed by John Butler, except where noted.

Release history

Personnel
 John Butler - resonator [Dobro] guitar, guitar [11 string], vocals
 Gavin Shoesmith - bass guitar and double bass
 Jason McGann - percussion

Credits
 Arrangements, Artwork, Producer - John Butler
 Artwork [Design, Layout] - Peter Nicol
 Engineer, Mixer - George Nikoloudis, Shaun O'Callaghan
 Mastering - Richard Mahony, Shaun O'Callaghan
 Photography [Disc Pic] - Tony Gajewski
 Photography [Photos Of John Butler's Art Pieces] - Danny Khoo

Certifications

References

1998 debut albums
John Butler Trio albums